Jack Gilbert Rentschler (born April 28, 1931) is an American politician. He served as a Republican member of the South Dakota House of Representatives.

Life and career 
Rentschler was born in Clay City, Indiana. He attended Indiana State University.

Rentschler was owner of Rentschler's Truck Plaza.

In 1991, Rentschler was elected to the South Dakota House of Representatives, serving until 1992.

References 

1931 births
Living people
Republican Party members of the South Dakota House of Representatives
20th-century American politicians
Indiana State University alumni